Philip Fleming (born c. 1587) was an English lawyer and politician who sat in the House of Commons at various times between 1614 and 1629.

Fleming was the son of Sir Thomas Fleming and his wife Mary James, the daughter of Dr Mark James. He matriculated at Christ Church, Oxford on 8 June 1604 aged 17. In 1612 he was called to the bar at Lincoln's Inn. In 1614, he was elected Member of Parliament for Lymington. He became steward of the Isle of Wight.  In 1621, he was elected MP for Newport (Isle of Wight) in a by-election. He was elected MP for Newport in another by-election in 1624. He was elected MP for Newport again in 1626 and 1628 and sat until 1629 when King Charles decided to rule without parliament for eleven years.

References

1580s births
Year of death missing
Lawyers from the Kingdom of England
Alumni of Christ Church, Oxford
Members of Lincoln's Inn
English MPs 1614
English MPs 1621–1622
English MPs 1624–1625
English MPs 1626
English MPs 1628–1629